Dean Roden Chapman (8 March 1922 – 4 October 1995) was a mechanical engineer at the National Aeronautics and Space Administration (NASA) and at Stanford University.

Biography
He played basketball for the oft-maligned Caltech Beavers men's basketball team while he got a B.S. from Caltech. He began his professional career at Ames Aeronautical Laboratory (now the Ames Research Center) in 1948, where he later became Director of Astronautics. He left government service in 1980 to join the faculty at Stanford University. At the time of his death from cancer at age 73, he was Professor Emeritus of the Department of Aeronautics and the Department of Mechanical Engineering at Stanford University. Chapman was internationally known for his research into fluid dynamics, and for pioneering modern computational fluid dynamics. He is also remembered for his research and controversial theories on the origin of tektites.

External resources

Obituary archive at Stanford University
Obituary at Lunar Planetary Institute

1922 births
1995 deaths
American mechanical engineers
American aerospace engineers
Engineering educators
Stanford University faculty
California Institute of Technology alumni
American scientists
20th-century American engineers
Deaths from cancer in California